Philip John Parham  (born 14 August 1960) is a British diplomat.

He was educated at Eton College and Christ Church, Oxford. He joined the Foreign and Commonwealth Office in 1993, served as UK High Commissioner to Tanzania from 2006 to 2009, as Ambassador and UK Deputy Permanent Representative to the United Nations in New York from 2009 to 2013, and as UK Ambassador to the United Arab Emirates from 2014 to 2018. In 2018 he was appointed to be the UK's Envoy to the Commonwealth.

Parham was appointed Companion of the Order of St Michael and St George (CMG) in the 2015 New Year Honours "for services to British multilateral foreign policy interests".

Parham is married to teacher and writer Kasia Giedroyc, sister of comedian Mel Giedroyc and director Coky Giedroyc. They have seven children.

References

1960 births
Living people
People educated at Eton College
Alumni of Christ Church, Oxford
High Commissioners of the United Kingdom to Tanzania
Ambassadors of the United Kingdom to the United Arab Emirates
Companions of the Order of St Michael and St George